Havre-Saint-Pierre is a town on Pointe-aux-Esquimaux, which is on the Quebec north shore (Côte-Nord) of the Saint Lawrence River in Canada.

Historically, the town's first inhabitants came from the Magdalen Islands in the nineteenth century. As a result, the people of the town speak a dialect much more closely related to Acadian French than to Quebec French.

Other important geological features near the town include the Romaine River to the north and west, les Chutes Manitou, on the Manitou River to the west, l'Ile du Havre, less than a kilometre offshore from the town, and Anticosti Island, which on clear days can be seen to the south of the town.

History
In 1857, a group of Acadian families from the Magdalen Islands, who had been deported from Savannah (Georgia, USA), settled on Eskimo Point (Pointe aux Esquimaux). The first mass was held on June 29, 1857, day of the feast of Saint Peter. In 1872, the Parish of Saint-Pierre-de-la-Pointe-aux-Esquimaux was officially established, the same year its post office opened under the name Esquimaux Point.

In 1873, the place was incorporated as a municipality. In 1924, the post office changed its name to Havre-Saint-Pierre, followed by the town in 1927, in order to focus on the harbor, which characterizes the area, while retaining the original parish name. It remained the largest town on the North Shore until 1936 when it was overtaken by Baie-Comeau.

Demographics

Population

Language

Economy

The city hospital is the major employer in the region. Havre-Saint-Pierre is also located near Canada's only titanium mine, for which the town serves as a port. The Chemin de fer de la Rivière Romaine brings it by rail cars to Havre-Saint-Pierre.

Tourism contributes significantly to the local economy due to the town's position near the Mingan Archipelago National Park Reserve, a park encompassing a large number of islands in Mingan Archipelago of the Gulf of Saint Lawrence. It is noted for the unique variety of flora and fauna to be found there, such as puffins and the rare Mingan Thistle, and for the unique geological features on many of the islands, which are referred to as "monoliths".

The town is also noted for the excellent fishing, being made up largely of snow crab, scallops, and lobster, with excellent salmon and trout to be found in the numerous rivers and lakes.

Climate
In spite of its maritime position just above the 50th parallel, Havre-Saint-Pierre has a relatively harsh subarctic climate, with cold winters and cool summers, although the fourth-warmest month of September is relatively close to the  isotherm to be cold humid continental. The high precipitation brings a lot of snowfall in winter.

Notable residents
Roland-Benoît Jomphe, poet
Jean-François Jomphe, NHL ice hockey player, was born in Havre-Saint-Pierre

See also
 List of municipalities in Quebec

References

Municipalities in Quebec
Incorporated places in Côte-Nord